Durukti (Devanāgari: दुरुक्ति, IAST: durukti, with all vowels short; from the roots दुर् (dur): "bad" and उक्ति (ukti): "speech"; lit. bad or offensive speech or 

She is the daughter of Krodha (anger) and Hinsa (violence). She begets a son named Bhaya (fear) and a daughter named Mrutyu (death). She is also the grandmother of a boy named Niraya (hell) and a girl named Yatana (torture) begotten by her children Bhaya and Mrutyu. Durukti and Kali belong to the lineage of Adharma (impropriety), who grows up from Maleen Pataka, a deadly dark and sinful affliction produced from Brahma's back at the time of creation. Durukti is the granddaughter of Lobha (greed) and Nikriti (dishonesty), great-granddaughter of Dambha (vanity) and Maya (illusion), and great-great-granddaughter of Adharma and Mithya (falsehood).

According to the Kalki Purana, Durukti dies shortly before Kali.

Notes

References 
Kalki Purana of Sri Veda Vyasa (Sanskrit), edited and published by Sri Jibananda Vidyasagara Bhattacharya at Narayana Press (Calcutta) in 1890, Section 1: Chapter 1 & Section 3: Chapter 7. Retrieved 5 September 2017.
The Penguin Book of Hindu Names, by Maneka Gandhi, pg 125. Retrieved 5 September 2017.
Sinhalese English Dictionary, by B. Clough, pg 796. Retrieved 5 September 2017.
Book. The Telegraph (Calcutta). 11 February 2013. Retrieved 5 September 2017.
KALI. Radhe.net. Retrieved 5 September 2017.

External links

Durukti at hindupedia.com

Demonesses in Hinduism
Consorts of Kali (demon)